The Augustine Institute (AI), located in Greenwood Village, Colorado, United States, is a private Catholic graduate theology school that offers master's degree programs inspired by Pope John Paul II's call for a New Evangelization. In addition, the Institute produces catechetical videos, records audio drama productions, publishes books, and distributes Catholic media materials. It is also the exclusive Catholic publisher of the ESV Catholic Edition Bible in North America.

History
At the 1993 World Youth Day in Denver, John Paul II called Catholics to a New Evangelization, to renew their commitment to Christ. As a response to this call, in 2005 founding president Jonathan Reyes established in Denver a graduate school dedicated to transforming Catholic education for the New Evangelization, particularly in response to post-modern culture.

On May 19, 2007, the first class of 11 students graduated.  In the 2009–2010 academic year, the Augustine Institute had 84 students taking courses on campus, and 157 students enrolled in its distance education program. In 2012, AI relocated from Teikyo Lorretto Heights to Greenwood Village in the Denver Tech Center. As of Fall 2019, it had 328 enrolled students or 144.1 full-time-equivalent, the third-largest Catholic lay ecclesial ministry program in the United States.

In 2015, the Augustine Institute merged with Lighthouse Catholic Media in “a new strategic alliance.”

Academics
The Augustine Institute's programs emphasize fidelity to the magisterium, especially as expressed in the apostolic constitution Ex corde Ecclesiae. Some Catholic dioceses use the institute's academic programs to help train their permanent deacons. The school stays closely connected to their local Catholic bishop, who is a member of the institute's Board of Trustees.

The Augustine Institute offers a Master of Arts in Theology degree and an MA in Leadership for the New Evangelization, both of which can be earned on campus or through distance education. The MA (Theology) degree curriculum focuses on the theological foundations for effective catechesis and evangelization. The required core curriculum consists of eight courses that provide students with a foundation in Theology, Evangelization, Sacred Scripture, and Church History. In addition, students have four elective options. The institute also offers MA Theology students a optional Concentration in Sacred Scripture, which includes additional requirements.

Education philosophy
Inspired by St. Augustine of Hippo's approach to theology and evangelization, the Institute "is committed to the pursuit of wisdom in service of Christian mission." It describes its distance education program as taking place "through high-definition videos, live-streamed interactive course offerings, telephone calls, promptly answered emails, lively online discussion, and substantive feedback on assignments." The vision of distance education it proposes has been described as  representing "creative fidelity to the Catholic tradition."

Authorization and Accreditation
The Colorado Department of Higher Education authorizes the Augustine Institute to grant degrees. In October 2018, the Colorado Commission on Higher Education renewed the Augustine Institute's authorization.

As of 2016, the Augustine Institute is fully accredited by the Association of Theological Schools and approved for comprehensive distance education.

FORMED Media Platform
The Augustine Institute operates a video, audio and ebook platform for Catholic content called FORMED,  which reaches over 5,000 parishes and one million subscribers “with content from 75 Catholic content providers, making it the largest collaboration of Catholic apostolates, parishes, diocese and organizations worldwide.”  The COVID-19 pandemic caused traffic to FORMED to double in 2020. The FORMED platform is used by many Catholic parishes to facilitate their catechetical efforts and train group leaders with Bible studies, sacramental preparation and faith formation programs.

Augustine Institute Studios
The Augustine Institute houses “a team of creative storytellers who craft captivating cinematic experiences” called Augustine Institute Studios. Their multi-part video productions include The Search (2020),  Presence: The Mystery of the Eucharist (2018),  Signs of Grace (2018),  Divine Mercy in the Second Greatest Story Ever Told (2016),  Forgiven (2016),  Beloved (2015),  Reborn (2015),  and Symbolon (2014).

Augustine Institute Radio Theatre
The Augustine Institute Radio Theatre has produced four audio drama series: Brother Francis: The Barefoot Saint of Assisi (2016), The Trials of St. Patrick (2017), Ode to Saint Cecilia (2017), and The Legends of Robin Hood (2019).  The 10-part audio drama, Brother Francis, won the 2018 Audie Award for Audio Drama, while The Trials of St. Patrick was a finalist for the Inspirational/Faith-Based Fiction award in the same year.  The audio drama, The Legends of Robin Hood, won five ATC Seneca awards for Best Original Score, Best Sound Design, Best Supporting Actor, and Best Leading Actor.

Journal
The Augustine Institute publishes Faith & Culture: The Journal of the Augustine Institute.

Book and Bible Publishing
In addition to producing study guides and leader guides to accompany video programs, the Augustine Institute publishes books in partnership with Ignatius Press, including the What Every Catholic Should Know series. The Augustine Institute also publishes the English Standard Version Catholic Edition Bible in North America in partnership with Crossway Books.

See also
Ascension (publisher)
Ignatius Press
Saint Benedict Press
Word on Fire

References

External links
 
 FORMED
 Augustine Institute YouTube channel

Catholic universities and colleges in Colorado
Universities and colleges in Denver
Roman Catholic Archdiocese of Denver
Distance education institutions based in the United States
Christianity in Denver
Educational institutions established in 2005
2005 establishments in Colorado